Matteo Sereni (born 11 February 1975) is an Italian former footballer who played as a goalkeeper.

Career
Born in Parma, Sereni started his career at UC Sampdoria, and was loaned out to A.C. Crevalcore in 1994. He returned to Sampdoria and only made 10 appearances before being transferred to Piacenza Calcio in 1997. Here he helped the club avoid relegation to Serie B, but in 1998 he transferred to Empoli F.C., where he failed to avoid relegation.

In 1999, Sereni returned to Sampdoria in Serie B and made 75 (out of 76) Serie B appearances. In 2001, Ipswich Town signed him for £4.5 million, which remains the highest transfer fee paid by the club. He failed to avoid relegation with Ipswich and was loaned to Brescia in 2002.

Lazio
In 2003, he transferred to Lazio, for €550,000 to compete for the number one goalkeeping slot with Angelo Peruzzi. In 2004, he started for the club in both legs of the 2004 Coppa Italia Final against Juventus F.C. and played the matches in the 2005 UEFA Intertoto Cup, when Lazio went out to Olympique de Marseille in the semi-finals.

In January 2006 he was loaned out to Treviso, with Samir Handanović going to Lazio on loan in return. He returned to Lazio for the 2006–07 campaign, but did not play a single match, being excluded from the roster for the whole season.

Torino
In June 2007 he signed for Torino in a free transfer to replace Christian Abbiati, signed a two-year contract. In November 2008, he signed a new contract which last until June 2011.

Brescia
On 5 July 2010 he was signed by Brescia Calcio for on free transfer. A few days before the last game of Serie A, his contract was mutually terminated, following the club's relegation a few weeks before.

International career
He was internationally selected at the age of 16 for the Italian national under-17 team, and played for the Italian national under-23 team at the 1997 Mediterranean Games, where Italy were champions.

Post-playing career
After divorcing his ex-wife Silvia, Sereni was accused of having raped their daughter during a 2009 holiday on Sardinia's Costa Smeralda. He denied the charges. In 2015, Sereni was found guilty, and was sentenced to three years and six months in prison. In July 2017, Sereni's conviction was annulled on appeal and he was scheduled a new trial in Turin.

References

External links
 National Team Statistics at FIGC official site
 Statistics at Voetbal International
http://aic.football.it/scheda/1507/sereni-matteo.htm

1975 births
Living people
Sportspeople from Parma
Italian footballers
Premier League players
Piacenza Calcio 1919 players
Empoli F.C. players
Ipswich Town F.C. players
Brescia Calcio players
U.C. Sampdoria players
S.S. Lazio players
Treviso F.B.C. 1993 players
Torino F.C. players
Serie A players
Serie B players
Association football goalkeepers
Italian expatriate footballers
Italy under-21 international footballers
Expatriate footballers in England
Italian expatriate sportspeople in England
Mediterranean Games gold medalists for Italy
Mediterranean Games medalists in football
Competitors at the 1997 Mediterranean Games
Footballers from Emilia-Romagna